Velyka Bahachka is an urban-type settlement in Poltava Oblast in Ukraine. It was formerly the administrative center of Velyka Bahachka Raion, but now administered within Myrhorod Raion. It is located on the Psel, a left tributary of the Dnieper. Population:  The first mentions of the settlement appeared at the end of the 16th - at the beginning of the 17th century. On Guillaume de Beauplan's map, created in the 17th century, it is marked as Bagachka. The settlement arose as a result of Cossack colonization.

Economy

Transportation
The settlement has access to Highway M03 connecting Kyiv and Kharkiv via Poltava. It also has road access to Myrhorod.

There is both local and long-distance passenger traffic.

References

Urban-type settlements in Myrhorod Raion
Mirgorodsky Uyezd